Meritech Capital Partners is an American Venture Firm company focused on late-stage venture capital investments in information technology companies with a focus on consumer Internet and media, software and services, enterprise infrastructure, and medical devices. Investments has included the popular online game Roblox, Datadog and Salesforce.

History

The Palo Alto, California-based firm, was founded in 1999 with sponsorship from Accel Partners, Oak Investment Partners, Redpoint Ventures and Worldview Technology Partners.  Since 2003, however, Meritech has independently operated and invested in later-stage technology companies. The firm has raised approximately $2.6 billion since inception across four funds. In July 2014 Meritech raised a $500 million fund with a $65 million sidecar vehicle.

References

External links
 
 MeriTech Capital Partners.  Business Week Profile

Venture capital firms of the United States
Financial services companies established in 1999
1999 establishments in California